Jared Daniel Rosholt (born August 4, 1986) is an American mixed martial artist currently competing in the Heavyweight division. A professional competitor since 2011, Rosholt has competed for the UFC, Titan FC, Professional Fighters League, and Legacy FC. He is the younger brother of former mixed martial artist Jake Rosholt.

Background
Rosholt was born and raised in Sandpoint, Idaho, attending Sandpoint High School before moving to Oklahoma his junior year where he attended Ponca City High School. Rosholt competed in wrestling as well as football. In wrestling, Rosholt was a member of Wrestling USA Magazine's 2005 All-America Dream Team, a four-time State Champion, and a two-time national runner-up. Rosholt continued wrestling at Oklahoma State University, following in the footsteps of his older brother, Jake, a three-time National Champion for the Cowboys. Jared Rosholt went on to be a three-time All-American and finished his collegiate career with an overall record of 125-27. That record qualified him as the winningest heavyweight in the history of the Oklahoma State wrestling program. His 125 wins also qualify as the fifth-most victories by a wrestler in any weight class in Oklahoma State history. Rosholt finished fourth in his division at the 2008 NCAA wrestling championships, third in 2009, and second in 2010. Rosholt's combination of size and speed had many wondering if he would follow the lead of his older brother Jake into MMA competition.

Mixed martial arts career

Early career
Rosholt made his professional mixed martial arts debut on February 26, 2011, where he won by submission (punches) in just 1:17 of the first round.

Titan Fighting
Rosholt came to fight on two days notice as a replacement to fight at Titan FC 18: Pulver vs. Davidson against Kirk Grinlinton. He won the fight by technical knockout at just 1:37 of the first round.

Ultimate Fighting Championship
Rosholt announced in mid-September that he has signed with the UFC. He made his debut against fellow newcomer Walt Harris on November 30, 2013, at The Ultimate Fighter 18 Finale. After being dropped in the first round, Rosholt rallied back in the second and third rounds, winning the fight via unanimous decision.

Rosholt was expected to face promotional newcomer Alexey Oleynik on January 25, 2014, at UFC on Fox 10. However, Oliynyk was forced out of the bout with an injury and Rosholt was pulled from the card altogether.

Rosholt faced Daniel Omielańczuk on April 11, 2014, at UFC Fight Night 39. Rosholt defeated Omielańczuk via unanimous decision.

Rosholt faced Soa Palelei on June 28, 2014, at UFC Fight Night 43. He won the fight via unanimous decision.

The rescheduled bout with Alexey Oleynik took place on November 22, 2014, at UFC Fight Night 57. Rosholt lost the fight via knockout in the first round.

Rosholt faced Josh Copeland on March 14, 2015, at UFC 185. He won the fight via TKO in the third round.

Rosholt faced Timothy Johnson on August 8, 2015, at UFC Fight Night 73. He won the fight by unanimous decision.

Rosholt faced Stefan Struve on November 14, 2015, at UFC 193. He won by unanimous decision.

Rosholt faced Roy Nelson on February 6, 2016, at UFC Fight Night 82. He lost the fight via unanimous decision and was subsequently released from the promotion.

Personal life
In addition to his brother Jake, Rosholt has three other siblings; a sister and two brothers who also competed in wrestling at Oklahoma State University.

Championships and accomplishments

Collegiate wrestling
 NCAA Division I Wrestling Championships
  2010 NCAA Division I 285 lb Runner-up
  2009 NCAA Division I 285 lb 3rd place 
 NCAA Division I All-American (Three times) 
 NCAA Division I qualifier (Four times)
 Big 12 Conference Wrestling Championships 
  2010 Big 12 Conference 285 lb Runner-up 
  2008 Big 12 Conference 285 lb Champion 
  2007 Big 12 Conference 285 lb Runner-up 
 Big 12 Championship Finalist (Three times) 
 Winningest heavyweight at Oklahoma State (125)

Submission wrestling
ADCC North American Championships
  2011 ADCC North American +99 kg Champion

Mixed martial arts record

|-
|Loss
|align=center|20–8
|Ali Isaev
|TKO (punches)
|PFL 10
|
|align=center|4
|align=center|4:09
|New York City, New York, United States
|
|-
|Win
|align=center|20–7 
|Kelvin Tiller
|Decision (unanimous)
|rowspan=2 | PFL 9
|rowspan=2 | 
|align=center| 3
|align=center| 5:00
|rowspan=2 | Las Vegas, Nevada, United States
|
|-
|Win
|align=center|19–7 
|Muhammed Dereese
|TKO (punches)
|align=center|1
|align=center|3:41
|
|-
|Win
|align=center|18–7 
|Satoshi Ishii
|Decision (unanimous)
|PFL 6
|
|align=center| 3
|align=center| 5:00
|Atlantic City, New Jersey, United States
|
|-
|Loss
|align=center|17–7 
|Denis Goltsov
|TKO (punches)
|PFL 3
|
|align=center| 1
|align=center| 2:03
|Uniondale, New York, United States
|
|-
|Loss
|align=center|17–6
|Philipe Lins
|TKO (punches)
| rowspan=2|PFL 8
| rowspan=2|
|align=center|2
|align=center|0:45
| rowspan=2|New Orleans, Louisiana, United States
|
|-
|Win
|align=center|17–5
|Kelvin Tiller
|Decision (unanimous)
|align=center|2
|align=center|5:00
|
|-
|Loss
|align=center|16–5
|Kelvin Tiller
|Submission (guillotine choke)
|PFL 4
|
|align=center| 2
|align=center| 0:54
|Uniondale, New York, United States
|
|-
|Win
|align=center|16–4
|Valdrin Istrefi
|Decision (unanimous)
|PFL 1
|
|align=center| 3
|align=center| 5:00
|New York City, New York, United States
|
|-
|Win
|align=center|15–4
|Nick Rossborough
|Decision (unanimous)
|Professional Fighters League 2: Everett
|
|align=center|3
|align=center|5:00
|Everett, Washington, United States
|
|-
|Loss
|align=center|14–4
|Caio Alencar
|KO (punches)
|WSOF 34
|
|align=center|1
|align=center|1:17
|New York City, New York, United States
|
|-
|Loss
|align=center|14–3
|Roy Nelson
|Decision (unanimous)
|UFC Fight Night: Hendricks vs. Thompson
|
|align=center|3
|align=center|5:00
|Las Vegas, Nevada, United States
|
|-
|Win
|align=center|14–2
|Stefan Struve
|Decision (unanimous)
|UFC 193
|
|align=center|3
|align=center|5:00
|Melbourne, Australia
|
|-
|Win
|align=center|13–2
|Timothy Johnson
|Decision (unanimous)
|UFC Fight Night: Teixeira vs. Saint Preux
|
|align=center|3
|align=center|5:00
|Nashville, Tennessee, United States
|
|-
|Win
|align=center|12–2
|Josh Copeland
|TKO (punches)
|UFC 185
|
|align=center|3
|align=center|3:12
|Dallas, Texas, United States
|
|-
|Loss
|align=center|11–2
| Aleksei Oleinik
|KO (punches)
|UFC Fight Night: Edgar vs. Swanson
|
|align=center|1
|align=center|3:21
| Austin, Texas, United States
|
|-
|Win
|align=center|11–1
| Soa Palelei
|Decision (unanimous)
|UFC Fight Night: Te-Huna vs. Marquardt
|
|align=center|3
|align=center|5:00
| Auckland, New Zealand
|
|-
|Win
|align=center|10–1
|Daniel Omielańczuk
|Decision (unanimous)
|UFC Fight Night: Nogueira vs. Nelson
|
|align=center|3
|align=center|5:00
|Abu Dhabi, United Arab Emirates
|
|-
|Win
|align=center|9–1
|Walt Harris
|Decision (unanimous)
|The Ultimate Fighter: Team Rousey vs. Team Tate Finale
|
|align=center|3
|align=center|5:00
|Las Vegas, Nevada, United States
|
|-
|Win
|align=center|8–1
|Jason Walraven
|KO (punch)
|C3 Fights: Summer Slamfest 2
|
|align=center|1
|align=center|0:34
|Newkirk, Oklahoma, United States
|
|-
|Win
|align=center|7–1
|Richard White
|TKO (punches)
|C3 Fights: Fighting For "Moore" Than Money
|
|align=center|1
|align=center|1:38
|Newkirk, Oklahoma, United States
|
|-
|Win
|align=center|6–1
|Bobby Brents
|Decision (unanimous)
|C3 Fights: Rock Em Sock Em Weekend
|
|align=center|3
|align=center|5:00
|Clinton, Oklahoma, United States
|
|-
|Win
|align=center|5–1
|Richard Odoms
|Decision (unanimous)
|Legacy FC 17
|
|align=center|3
|align=center|5:00
|San Antonio, Texas, United States
|
|-
|Loss
|align=center|4–1
|Derrick Lewis
|KO (punches)
|Legacy FC 13
|
|align=center|2
|align=center|4:41
|Dallas, Texas, United States
|
|-
|Win
|align=center|4–0
|Robert Haney
|TKO (knees to the body)
|C3 MMA Championship Fights
|
|align=center|1
|align=center|1:56
|Concho, Oklahoma, United States
|
|-
|Win
|align=center|3–0
|Kirk Grinlinton
|TKO (punches)
|Titan FC 18: Pulver vs. Davidson
|
|align=center|1
|align=center|1:37
|Kansas City, Kansas, United States
|
|-
|Win
|align=center|2–0
|Ray Clayton
|Submission (americana)
|Cowboy MMA: Caged Cowboys
|
|align=center|2
|align=center|4:48
|Ponca City, Oklahoma, United States
|
|-
|Win
|align=center|1–0
|Dee Burchfield
|TKO (punches)
|Art of War Cage Fights
|
|align=center|1
|align=center|1:17
|Ponca City, Oklahoma, United States
|
|-

See also
 List of male mixed martial artists

References

External links
 
 
 Oklahoma State University Athletics – Jared Rosholt

American male sport wrestlers
Oklahoma State Cowboys wrestlers
American male mixed martial artists
Mixed martial artists from Idaho
Heavyweight mixed martial artists
Mixed martial artists utilizing collegiate wrestling
Ultimate Fighting Championship male fighters
Living people
1986 births
People from Sandpoint, Idaho